Duke Mu may refer to these ancient Chinese rulers:

Duke Mu of Cao ( 8th century BC)
Duke Mu of Chen (672–632 BC)
Duke Mu of Qin (died 621 BC)

See also
King Mu (disambiguation)